The Włodzimierz Trzebiatowski Institute of Low Temperature and Structure Research is a scientific institute in Wrocław, Poland. It is named after Włodzimierz Trzebiatowski, the Polish chemist, physicist and mathematician.

Localization
Until 1993 the Institute was placed at Gajowicka street and the Bishop Palace, that after the II World War was requisitioned by the  Polish People's Republic government. Currently the Institute is placed at Okólna street in Wrocław.

External links
Institute webpage 

Scientific organisations based in Poland
Buildings and structures in Wrocław
Physics institutes
Institutes of the Polish Academy of Sciences